Aliyan vs Aliyan was an Indian Malayalam-language sitcom directed by Rajesh Thalachira, broadcast on Amrita TV from 17 February 2017 to 25 April 2019. The show aired on every Monday to Friday at 9:00 PM (IST). The sitcom won the 2017 Kerala State Television Award for Best Comedy Program.

A sequel titled Aliyans aired on Kaumudy TV since 24 February 2020 with same cast.

Plot summary 
Set in Trivandrum, the story revolves around the life of Ratnamma and her family highlighting the daily incidents and the love-hate relationship between the two brothers in-law, Kanakan and Cleatus.

Cast

Main cast 
 Aneesh Ravi as Kanakan/Hawildar Veerabhadran
 Riyas Narmakala as Cleatus
 Manju Pathrose as Thankam
 Soumya Bhagyananthan as Jamanthi
 Sethu Lakshmi as Ratnamma
 Akshaya as Thakkilimol
 Mani Shoranur as Azhakesan Ammavan

Recurring cast 
 Binoj Kulathoor as Ambilikkuttan
 Hari Nambotha as Mathukutti
 Sujith Kozhikode as Fazil
 Mani Shornur as Azhakeshan/Ammavan
 Rithu Nilaa as Nallu
 Azees Nedumangad as Azees
 Anzar Babu as Ansar
 Anu Joseph as SI Anupama
 Sajeev as Clara

Former cast 
 Manikandan Pattambi as Kanakan
 Sneha Sreekumar as Jamanthi
 Salim as Fazil
 Kalabhavan Haneef
 Sini Prasad as Shyama
 Hari Nambotha as Maathan/ Mathukutty

Awards

References

External links 
 

Indian television sitcoms
Indian television soap operas
Serial drama television series
2017 Indian television series debuts
Malayalam-language television shows
Indian drama television series